Włoszczowa  is a town in southern Poland, in Świętokrzyskie Voivodeship, about  west of Kielce. It is the capital of Włoszczowa County. Population is 10,756 (2004). Włoszczowa lies in historic Lesser Poland, and from its foundation until 1795 (see Partitions of Poland), it belonged to Sandomierz Voivodeship. The town has the area of 30 km2 (11 sq miles), and is a junction of regional roads nr 786, nr 742, and 785. Włoszczowa has two rail stations: PKP Włoszczowa (on the Kielce - Częstochowa route), and PKP Włoszczowa Północ (Włoszczowa North) (on the Central Rail Line).

Włoszczowa was first mentioned in 1154, when Prince Henryk Sandomierski handed the village known then as Vloszcova to the Sovereign Military Order of Malta monks. It received its town charter in 1539, when King Zygmunt Stary handed the document to the starosta of Chęciny, Hieronim Szafraniec. The town remained the property of the Szafraniec family until the late 18th century. In the Kingdom of Poland and the Polish–Lithuanian Commonwealth, Włoszczowa was part of Lesser Poland's Sandomierz Voivodeship. After the Partitions of Poland, it belonged to Russian-controlled Congress Poland (1815 - 1918). In the Second Polish Republic, Włoszczowa belonged to Kielce Voivodeship. It had a large Jewish population, which made 50% of its population in 1925. Almost all Włoszczowa's Jews were murdered by the Germans in the Holocaust. Among points of interest there are remains of a 12th-century gord, with traces of a moat, and ruins of the Szafraniec family castle (16th century). Furthermore, there is a 17th-century parish church, and the 16th-century urban layout of the streets.

Twin towns
Włoszczowa is twinned with:

  Illintsi, Ukraine
  Le Passage, Lot-et-Garonne, France

External links

Official website

Cities and towns in Świętokrzyskie Voivodeship
Włoszczowa County
Sandomierz Voivodeship
Kielce Governorate
Kielce Voivodeship (1919–1939)
Holocaust locations in Poland